Andrei Lorel Șeran (born 11 March 1985 in Târgoviște) is a Romanian professional football player.

External links
 Career summary at KLISF

1985 births
Living people
Romanian footballers
Expatriate footballers in Russia
FC SKA-Khabarovsk players
AFC Chindia Târgoviște players
Liga II players
Association football defenders
Sportspeople from Târgoviște